The First Spooner Act of 1902 (also referred to as the Panama Canal Act, 32 Stat. 481) was written by a United States senator from Wisconsin, John Coit Spooner, enacted on June 28, 1902, and signed by President Roosevelt the following day. It authorized purchasing the assets of a French syndicate called the Compagnie Nouvelle du Canal de Panama, provided that a treaty could be negotiated with the Republic of Colombia. 

The syndicate, headed by Philippe-Jean Bunau-Varilla, sold at a price reduced from $110 million to only $40 million. US lawyer William Nelson Cromwell subsequently received a commission of $800,000 for his lobbying. 

The Spooner Act was followed by the Hay–Bunau-Varilla Treaty of November 18, 1903.

See also
 History of the Panama Canal
 Panama Canal Railway
 Ferdinand de Lesseps

References

External links
 http://www.czbrats.com/Builders/spooner.htm
 http://www.answers.com/topic/panama-canal-purchase-act-1902

Panama Canal